Miss International Puerto Rico (previously called Miss Puerto Rico) is a national beauty pageant in Puerto Rico.

History
The first Puerto Rican delegate in Miss International was Carmen Sara Látimer, sent in 1960. Since 1960, Puerto Rico has produced two winners (Laurie Simpson in 1987 and Valerie Hernandez in 2014), one 3rd runner-up and ten semi-finalists. The Miss Puerto Rico pageant had the Miss International franchise from 1960 to 1997, after a two-year hiatus, a new pageant was created called Miss Puerto Rico Turismo that sent representatives until 2007 when a new organization acquired the franchise (Creative Options Inc. – Fernando Oquendo Vega). Nuestra Belleza Puerto Rico acquired the License in 2016 - President Miguel Deliz.

Representatives

The Miss International pageant began in 1960 and since then Puerto Rico has had 14 representatives classify in the finals including: 2 winners, 1 runner-up and 11 semi-finalists.

Since 2016 - Currently, the copyright of Miss International Puerto Rico has been transferred to Nuestra Belleza Puerto Rico.

Color key

The winner of Miss International Puerto Rico represents her country at the Miss International. On occasion, when the winner does not qualify (due to age) for either contest, a runner-up is sent.

References

External links
Por La Corona

Beauty pageants in Puerto Rico
Puerto Rico